HMS Glasgow is the first Type 26 frigate to be built for the United Kingdom's Royal Navy. The Type 26 class will partially replace the navy's thirteen Type 23 frigates, and will be a multi-mission warship designed to support anti-submarine warfare, air defence and general purpose operations.

Construction
The ship is being assembled on the River Clyde in Glasgow. The first steel was cut for Glasgow in July 2017 with the ship expected to be delivered in 2024 and operational in about 2026. In January 2018, work started on the second hull section.

In January 2020, the Royal Navy announced that the ship was more than halfway through construction. In July 2020, the Royal Navy announced that work on the final section of Glasgow has started.

On 18 April 2021, the fore section of the ship moved out from its building shed on the Clyde, and on 1 May 2021 was joined with its aft section for the first time. She was then launched on 25 November 2022 in preparation for tow to the BAE Scotstoun shipyard for her fitting out. Commissioning was anticipated by late 2026 to be followed by a work-up period prior to reaching initial operating capability. In October 2022, the Secretary of State for Defence, Ben Wallace, stated that the initial operating capability (IOC) for the ship had slipped from 2027 to 2028.

References

Type 26 frigates of the Royal Navy
2022 ships